Charles Robert Broberg  (22 May 1870 – 20 November 1937) was a New Zealand policeman. He was born in Auckland, New Zealand, on 22 May 1870.

In July 1927, to mark the visit of the Duke and Duchess of York to New Zealand, Broberg was appointed a Member of the Royal Victorian Order.

References

1870 births
1937 deaths
New Zealand police officers
People from Auckland
New Zealand Members of the Royal Victorian Order